Kamel Zeghli (born 20 August 1993 in Béjaïa) is an Algerian football player who plays for JSM Béjaïa.

Club career
In the 2011–2012 season, Kamel was a member of JSM Béjaïa's Under-21 team that won the league-cup double, scoring a goal in the final of the 2011–12 Algerian U21 Cup against ASO Chlef.

On 22 December 2012, Zeghli made his senior debut for Béjaïa, coming as a half-time substitute in a league game against ASO Chlef.

References

External links
 
 

1993 births
Algerian footballers
Algerian Ligue Professionnelle 1 players
Algeria youth international footballers
JSM Béjaïa players
CS Constantine players
CR Belouizdad players
MC Oran players
Living people
Footballers from Béjaïa
Association football defenders
Association football forwards
21st-century Algerian people